KMNE may refer to:

 KMNE-FM, a radio station (90.3 FM) licensed to Bassett, Nebraska, United States
 KMNE-TV, a television station (channel 7 analog/15 digital) licensed to Bassett, Nebraska, United States